José Gerardo "Jamaicón" Villegas Tavares (20 June 1934 – 24 December 2021) was a Mexican footballer who played as a defender for the Mexico national team at the 1958 and 1962 World Cup matches.

Biography
Villegas was born in the neighborhood of “La Experiencia” in Zapopan and as many in his town he was a textile industry worker. In his infancy he was nicknamed “Jamaicón” because he cried too much (in some regions of Mexico, “Jamaicón” is considered a polite way to call someone a whiner). He began his football career playing for “Club Imperio” in 1949 and he was selected to the Jalisco State youth league in 1951. In the second round of his selection his team went to play for the National Championship final in the state of Nuevo León.

He was raised at the center of a typical Mexican family, and as most other youth in his town, he would work in textiles, and then play in his spare time. His ability to play as a defensive player allowed him to play with one of the best Mexican football clubs, C.D. Guadalajara, known as “Chivas del Guadalajara”. He won eight championships with the Chivas, assisted in 13 World Cup play-offs and played in two World Cups. As a right defensive player he could not be passed by and faced world-renowned players who he stopped from scoring., perhaps the most memorable being Garrincha of Botafogo.

Villegas died on 24 December 2021, at the age of 87.

1962 World Cup

While Mexico prepared to play in the World Cup at Chile in 1962 it was said that if Villegas had defeated Garrincha time and time again, surely there was enough defensive strength in the Mexico national team for the World Cup. The Mexican Football Federation went on a tour of trial games with Ignacio Trelles at the head and their first stop was London, England. Trelles decided to line up “Piolín” Mota, a second-string goalkeeper. Mota was quite concerned with the startup but Trelles told him he had nothing to worry about as Villegas would be there to defend the goal. Mexico lost 8–0 against England. As a reporter approached him to interview him on his disappointing performance, he said he missed his mother and days had gone by where he could not eat "birria" and that life was not worth it if he was not in his town.

Another interesting fact was that, even though he had defeated Garrincha in league games, he was so afraid of him during the 1962 World Cup he constantly asked where the attacker was.

Jamaicon Syndrome
A story also tells that one day he sneaked out of a dinner that was served to the Mexican team in Lisbon, prior to the Sweden World Cup of 1958. The trainer was made aware of this and found him in the Hotel garden, sitting under a tree hugging his legs and looking at the stars with melancholy. As he asked him if he had eaten dinner and everything was Ok, “Jamaicón” answered “How can I eat dinner if that was prepared for a bunch of presumptuous people? All I want are my “chalupas”, some “sopes” and not that trash that's not even Mexican”.

Ever since, the phenomenon of Mexicans missing Mexico when they are out of the country is known as “The Jamaicón Syndrome”.

References

Further reading
 

1934 births
2021 deaths
Association football defenders
Mexican footballers
C.D. Guadalajara footballers
Mexico international footballers
1958 FIFA World Cup players
1962 FIFA World Cup players
Footballers from Jalisco